This article describes the diplomatic affairs, foreign policy and international relations of Ecuador
Ecuador is a founding member of the UN and a member of many of its specialized agencies; it is also a member of the Organization of American States (OAS), as well as many regional groups, including the Rio Group, the Latin American Economic System, the Latin American Energy Organization, the Latin American Integration Association, and the Andean Pact.

Ecuador's principal foreign-policy objectives have traditionally included defense of its territory from both external aggression and internal subversion as well as support for the objectives of the UN and the OAS. Although Ecuador's foreign relations were traditionally centered on the United States, Ecuador's membership in the Organization of Petroleum Exporting Countries (OPEC) in the 1970s and 1980s allowed Ecuadorian leaders to exercise somewhat greater foreign policy autonomy. Ecuador's foreign policy goals under the Borja government in the late 1980s were more diversified than those of the Febres Cordero administration, which closely identified with the United States. For example, Ecuador was more active in its relations with the Third World, multilateral organizations, Western Europe, and socialist countries.

Ecuador has offered humanitarianian aid to many countries, is a supporter of the United Nations, and currently contributes troops to the UN mission in Haiti. Ecuador has also been an elective member of the UN Security Council.

In Antarctica, Ecuador has maintained a peaceful research station for scientific study in the British-claimed territory and is a member nation of the Antarctica Treaty.

Domestic politics

The Presidency of Rafael Correa in the early 21st century saw a radical change in the country's foreign policy. Traditional ties with the United States grew more acrimonious and there were increased ties with the governments of Russia and Iran. 
The relations with the United States, however, improved significantly during the presidency of his successor Lenin Moreno since 2017.

Relations by country
List of countries which Ecuador maintains diplomatic relations with:

Former diplomatic relations:

  (6 January 1946 – 17 November 1971)
  (23 July 1973 – 3 October 1990)

See also
 List of diplomatic missions in Ecuador
 List of diplomatic missions of Ecuador

References